Nicrophorus japonicus is a burying beetle described by Edgar von Harold in 1877. It has eastern Palearctic distribution in Japan, Korea, Mongolia, northern and central China, and the Ussuri region of Russia (Siberia).

References

Silphidae
Beetles of Asia
Beetles described in 1877